Edge FM 102.5 is a commercial radio station broadcasting from Deniliquin, New South Wales, Australia. It is currently owned by ACE Radio & broadcasts an Adult Contemporary (AC) format. It features both locally produced content & network content from ACE Radio. There are repeaters in Cobram (88.5FM) and Echuca (103.9FM). In 2017, Edge FM 102.5 (then branded as 102.5 The Edge) came under the ownership of ACE Radio as its parent company North East Broadcasters was acquired by ACE.

History 
Formerly known as Classic Rock 102.5, in 2013 the station dropped its classic rock format, rebranding as FM102.5 and switching to pop music Easy Listening. On 1 September 2015, the station rebranded as 102.5 The Edge, in line with Wangaratta sister station 102.1 The Edge (now Edge FM 102.1). In 2017, 102.5 The Edge was purchased by Victorian broadcasters ACE Radio, converted to Edge FM 102.5 and now runs a Hot AC music format, targeting under 45’s.

References

Radio stations in New South Wales
Radio stations in Victoria
Adult contemporary radio stations in Australia
Radio stations established in 1995